The Amateur Baseball Federation of India (ABFI) is the governing body for baseball in India. The ABFI was founded on 11 December 1983 in Rohtak, Haryana, and became a member of the Baseball Federation of Asia (BFA) and the International Baseball Federation in 1985. The federation was officially recognized as the national governing body of baseball in India by the Union Ministry of Youth Affairs and Sports in 1991, and by the Indian Olympic Association (IOA) in 2002.

See also
 Baseball in India
 India national baseball team
 India women's national baseball team

References

External links
 ABFI official website
 Baseball India official website

Baseball in India
Baseball
Sports organizations established in 1983
1983 establishments in Haryana
Organisations based in Himachal Pradesh